The company Winternals (later purchased by Microsoft) used to provide three kinds of programs for DOS that could handle NTFS formatted drives.

The NTFSDOS programs

NTFSDOS 
The first program was NTFSDOS - a freeware utility for DOS (NTFSDOS.EXE) that allows read-only access to NTFS formatted drives from a DOS environment.

NTFSDOS Tools 
The second program was NTFSDOS Tools - an add-on package for NTFSDOS that contains two commercial utilities for DOS - NTFSCopy and NTFSRen. The former (NTFSCOPY.EXE) could be used to overwrite corrupt files with fresh versions. The latter (NTFSREN.EXE) could be used to change the names of bad drivers so Windows wouldn't load them.

NTFSDOS Professional 
The final program was NTFSDOS Professional - a whole commercial solution for handling read and write operations in NTFS from a DOS environment. It must be installed as a package for Microsoft Windows first.

The downloaded version comes in demoware form. The user can only use the package in read-only mode in order to evaluate it.

Commercial NTFSDOS packages become abandonware 
Winternals was acquired by Microsoft on July 18, 2006.  Microsoft has removed any traces of NTFSDOS, NTFSDOS Tools and NTFSDOS Professional from the new internal site of Microsoft's Winternals' utilities.

References

DOS software